Tima Budzievna Turieva (born 22 June 1992) is a Russian weightlifter. She competed at the 2013 World Championships in the Women's 63 kg, winning the gold medal.

References

Russian female weightlifters
1992 births
Living people
World Weightlifting Championships medalists
People from Digorsky District
Universiade medalists in weightlifting
Universiade silver medalists for Russia
European Weightlifting Championships medalists
Medalists at the 2017 Summer Universiade
Sportspeople from North Ossetia–Alania
20th-century Russian women
21st-century Russian women